Mrše is a small village in the Municipality of Hrpelje-Kozina in the Littoral region of Slovenia.

References

External links
Mrše on Geopedia

Populated places in the Municipality of Hrpelje-Kozina